Sir Charles Turner, 1st Baronet (1666 – 24 November 1738) of Warham, Norfolk was an English lawyer and Whig politician who sat in the English and British House of Commons for 43 years from 1695 to 1738. He was a brother-in-law of Sir Robert Walpole, and held public office almost continuously from 1707. By 1730 he was the longest-serving MP in the House of Commons.

Turner was baptised on 11 June 1666, the son of William Turner, attorney-at-law of North Elmham, Norfolk, and his wife Anne Spooner, daughter of John Spooner. He was educated at Scarning and Norwich and was admitted at Caius College, Cambridge on 29 April 1681. He was also admitted to the Middle Temple on 22 July 1684 and became a country attorney like his father. His fortunes were boosted by the improving success of his own family and his influential connections, which were to include the Walpole family. In April 1689, he married Mary Walpole, daughter of Robert Walpole and sister of Sir Robert Walpole the first Prime Minister.

Turner helped his father-in-law's election at the 1695 English general election, when he was returned himself as Member of Parliament for King's Lynn with his uncle Sir John Turner. He was knighted on 22 March 1696. With his position unassailable, he was returned unopposed at every general election for the rest of his life. He was appointed a Lord of Trade in 1707 and was then Lord of the Admiralty from 1714 to 1717.

In 1720 Turner was appointed Lord of the Treasury. He was created a baronet on 27 April 1727. From 1729 he was a Teller of the Exchequer, retiring as Lord of the Treasury in 1730. He became Father of the House in 1730.

Turner's first wife Mary died in 1701 and by 1705 he married, secondly, Mary Catelyn, widow of Sir Nevil Catelyn of Kirby Cane and daughter of Sir William Blois of Grundisburgh, Suffolk. He died suddenly on 24 November 1738, at Houghton and was buried at Warham. By his first wife he had a son who predeceased him and four daughters. He was succeeded by his younger brother John.

References

External links 
 The Peerage.com

1666 births
1738 deaths
People from King's Lynn
Turner baronets
English MPs 1695–1698
English MPs 1698–1700
English MPs 1701
English MPs 1701–1702
English MPs 1702–1705
English MPs 1705–1707
Members of the Parliament of Great Britain for English constituencies
British MPs 1707–1708
British MPs 1708–1710
British MPs 1710–1713
British MPs 1713–1715
British MPs 1715–1722
British MPs 1722–1727
British MPs 1727–1734
British MPs 1734–1741
People from Warham, Norfolk
Lords of the Admiralty